The 1993 Railway Cup Hurling Championship was the 65th staging of the Railway Cup since its establishment by the Gaelic Athletic Association in 1927. The cup began on 10 October 1993 and ended on 7 November 1993. Connacht – the defending champions – were beaten by Leinster in the semi-final. On 7 November 1993, Leinster won the cup after a 1-15 to 2–06 defeat of Ulster in the final. This was their 20th Railway Cup title overall and their first title since 1988.

Results

Semi-finals

Final

Bibliography

 Donegan, Des, The Complete Handbook of Gaelic Games (DBA Publications Limited, 2005).

References

Railway Cup Hurling Championship
Railway Cup Hurling Championship
Hurling